"The Voice Within" is a song by American singer Christina Aguilera from her fourth studio album, Stripped (2002). The song was written by Aguilera and Glen Ballard, with production handled by Ballard. It is a piano-driven ballad that talks about trusting oneself and one's instincts. "The Voice Within" was released as the fifth and final single from Stripped on October 27, 2003, by RCA Records.

Upon its release, "The Voice Within" received mainly positive reviews from music critics, who called it an inspirational ballad and praised Aguilera's strong vocals on the track. Some likened the song to works by Celine Dion and Mariah Carey. Commercially, "The Voice Within" peaked within the top 10 of charts in several countries, including Australia, Ireland, Switzerland, and the United Kingdom. In the United States, the song reached number 33 on the Billboard Hot 100.

An accompanying music video for "The Voice Within" was directed by David LaChapelle. It was filmed in black and white as a one shot. The video was nominated for three MTV Video Music Awards at the 2004 ceremony. In support of Stripped, Aguilera performed the track on her two major concert tours: Justified and Stripped Tour (2002–03) and The Stripped Tour (2003). "The Voice Within" has been covered on several television talent shows.

Background and composition

"The Voice Within" was written by Christina Aguilera and Glen Ballard, and was produced by Ballard. The track was recorded by Scott Campbell at The Record Plant in Hollywood, Los Angeles, California and at NRG Recording Studios in North Hollywood, LA, CA, while it was mixed by Peter Mokran. Bass was performed by Mike Elizondo, while Matt Chamberlain played drums. Ballard also played guitar with John Goux, and played keyboards with Randy Kerber. Musically, "The Voice Within" is a piano-driven ballad. Composed in the key of G major, (later the key modulates to A major) it has a moderately slow tempo of 66 beats per minute. Aguilera's vocal range on the track spans from the low-note of D3 to the high-note of F♯5. Her vocals on the song were described as strong and powerful by critics. Lyrically, "The Voice Within" is an inspirational song that says that one should trust one's heart and own mind, and find inner strength.
The motivational lyrics include, "When there's no-one else, look inside yourself, like your oldest friend just trust the voice within". As recalled by Aguilera, "I wrote this song when I was 20, 21, and it was a time in my life when you're being pushed and pulled in so many directions." "The Voice Within" was released to US contemporary hit and adult contemporary radio stations on October 27, 2003, as the fifth and final single from Stripped by RCA Records. It was also available for Maxi single sales in stores.

Critical reception 
Upon its release, "The Voice Within" received generally favorable reviews from music critics. Chuck Taylor of Billboard praised the "breathtaking and organically flowing" melody, noting that "Aguilera delivers what is perhaps her most assured vocal yet, punching through the clouds and taking her place as a fist-shaking member of the heavenly choir." Taylor also highlighted that the track "is an inspired recording and a showcase for all that this artist can accomplish when she lets the voice precede that offputting image." Josh Kun from Spin labelled it a "swoony Celine-for-teens ballad". Sal Cinquemani for Slant Magazine gave the song a very positive review, naming it an "inspirational" ballad and praised her powerful vocals. CD Universe also praised Aguilera's "rich, throaty style" vocals on the track and compared the song to works by Mariah Carey. Sputnikmusic's critic Amanda Murray commented that the song is "tacky" yet "powerful all the same". Rachel McRady of Wetpaint complimented the song's inspiration melody, declaring that it "basically reduces us to tears every time we hear it".

Accolades

Commercial performance 
On November 29, 2003, "The Voice Within" made it chart debut on the US Billboard Hot 100 chart at number 62, becoming the week's "Hot Shot Debut". On the chart issue dated December 6, 2003, the single jumped to number 57. During the following week, the song rose to number 46. In its fourth week charting, it charted at number 36. Finally, it reached its peak at number 33 on January 10, 2004. The song became Aguilera's eleventh top-forty hit on the chart, and remained on the Hot 100 for a total of 16 weeks. It also charted at number 11 on the Pop Songs chart, number 16 on the Adult Contemporary chart, and number 33 on the Adult Pop Songs chart. The song reached number ten on the Canadian Hot 100 chart. Throughout Europe, "The Voice Within" achieved moderate success on charts, reaching the top ten on many of them. It was also a top-ten song in Australia, peaking at number eight in the country, making the fifth single from the album to reach the top-ten. In Switzerland, "The Voice Within" was Stripped highest charting-single along with the lead-single "Dirrty", peaking at number three.

Music video
The song's music video was directed by David LaChapelle, who previously directed the music videos for "Dirrty" (2002) and "Can't Hold Us Down" (2003). and produced by Media Magik Entertainment. He explained to MTV News that the video's concept, "There's all kinds of connotations to the word 'stripped.' I wanted to strip it down to one take. Just her and this incredible voice. And really not have anything that is going to overshadow that. She's trying to grow as an artist and along the way she's taking all kinds of risks and a lot of times people let those things overshadow her ability and her talent. I wanted to bring it all back as a sort of bookend to this album". The video begins with a close-up scene of Aguilera and zooms out to her wearing a slip and sitting in an abandoned prop room. In one continuous black and white shot, Aguilera walks through several rooms, exits the building, and finally lies on a light box. The video was filmed at a deserted theater in downtown Los Angeles. It was inspired by neorealist works. The video was nominated for three 2004 MTV Video Music Awards: Best Female Video, Viewer's Choice, and Best Cinematography.

Live performances

Aguilera performed "The Voice Within" for the first time during the Justified & Stripped Tour (2003), a tour held in support of Aguilera's Stripped and Justin Timberlake's album Justified (2002). During the tour's late 2003 extension, The Stripped Tour, Aguilera also performed the track. The performance is included in the video release Stripped Live in the U.K. (2004). Aguilera included the song on her setlist at a concert in Kuala Lumpur in 2014. In 2016, Aguilera also performed the track during her set at the 15th edition of Mawazine Festival.

In July 2021, Aguilera performed the song for two nights at the Hollywood Bowl with Gustavo Dudamel and the Los Angeles Philharmonic. In March 2022, she sang "The Voice Within" during the Expo 2020 concert in Dubai.

Covers
On October 3, 2005, Roxane LeBrasse covered "The Voice Within" during the top nine show of the third season of Australian singing contest Australian Idol. Despite being well received by judges, she was eliminated that night. On March 28, 2006, Katharine McPhee performed the track live on the 24th show of the fifth season of American Idol, which resulted McPhee as one of the bottom two. Simon Cowell compared McPhee's abilities to those of Aguilera, commenting that her performance was almost as good as the original singer.

Track listings

Credits and personnel
Credits are adapted from the liner notes of Stripped.
Recording locations
 Recorded at The Record Plant in Hollywood, Los Angeles, California and NRG Recording Studios in North Hollywood, Los Angeles, California
Personnel

 Vocals - Christina Aguilera
 Songwriting – Christina Aguilera, Glen Ballard
 Producing – Glen Ballard
 Recorded – Scott Campbell
 Mixing – Peter Mokran
 Bass – Mike Elizondo
 Drums – Matt Chamberlain
 Guitar – Glen Ballard, John Goux
 Keyboards – Glen Ballard, Randy Kerber

Charts

Weekly charts

Year-end charts

Release history

References

2000s ballads
2002 songs
2003 singles
Black-and-white music videos
Christina Aguilera songs
Music videos directed by David LaChapelle
RCA Records singles
Songs written by Christina Aguilera
Songs written by Glen Ballard
Pop ballads